Mohammad Ansari (born September 23, 1991 in Tehran, Iran) is an Iranian football player, who currently plays for Mes Rafsanjan in Persian Gulf Pro League. Ansari had been a key player in Persepolis in the recent years and helped the Reds win back-to-back titles in Iran league.He is also known for his positions in favor of the hardliners of the Islamic Republic.

Club career

Persepolis

Ansari joined Iranian giants Persepolis from Azadegan League side Shahrdari Tabriz. Ansari quickly became a first team regular at the left back position and was one of the surprise performers of the 2015–16 season. He played an important role for Persepolis in his second season when they won the Persian Gulf Pro League in the 2016–17 which resulted in calling up to the national team.

While playing for Persepolis in AFC Champions League 2018 Final, he suffered a serious injury and ruled out of remaining games till end of the season. In season 2018-2019 Persian Gulf Pro League, he achieved  championship of the league with Perspolis F.C.

Mes Rafsanjan 
On 19 March 2021, Ansari signed a contract with Persian Gulf Pro League team Mes Rafsanjan.

Club Career Statistics

 Assist Goals

National football team

International career

Ansari was called up to the senior Iran squad by Carlos Queiroz for friendlies against Macedonia and Kyrgyzstan in June 2016. He made his debut on 10 November 2016 against Papua New Guinea in a friendly match. In 2017 Queiroz assigned him a defender position. He is scheduled to play against South Korea and Syria in the third round of the 2018 FIFA World Cup. In May 2018 he was named in Iran's preliminary squad for the 2018 World Cup in Russia. He did not make the final 23.

Honours

Club
Persepolis
Persian Gulf Pro League (4): 2016–17, 2017–18, 2018–19, 2019–20
Hazfi Cup (1): 2018–19
Iranian Super Cup (3): 2017, 2018, 2019
AFC Champions League runner-up: 2018, 2020

References

External links

 Mohammad Ansari On Instagram
Mohammad Ansari at Persian League

1991 births
Iranian footballers
Living people
Persian Gulf Pro League players
Azadegan League players
Esteghlal F.C. players
Fajr Sepasi players
Shahrdari Tabriz players
Persepolis F.C. players
Sportspeople from Tehran
Association football defenders